The Empress Eugénie Archipelago (Russian: Архипелаг императрицы Евгении), commonly known as the Eugénie Archipelago, is an archipelago in Peter the Great Gulf in the Sea of Japan, along the southern coast of Primorsky Krai, Russia. The population of the archipelago is 6,810 (2005), and is administratively part of the city of Vladivostok.

Name
The archipelago was named after Eugénie de Montijo, the wife of Napoleon III, Emperor of the French, by a French sailor in the 1850s. The name was not used in the Soviet period for ideological reasons, but began to be used again after 1994.

Geography
The Eugénie Archipelago consists of five large islands: Russky Island, Popov Island, Rikord Island, Reyneke Island and Shkot Island, and a large number of small islands, including Ushi Island and Yelena Island. A number of islets, sea stacks and smaller rocks dot the coastline of the islands. Russky, the largest and northernmost island of the archipelago, is located immediately south of Vladivostok and separated from the city by the Eastern Bosphorus. In 2012, the Russky Bridge was completed to connect Russky Island to the mainland, and in 2013 a new campus of Far Eastern Federal University was opened on the island as part of further development. Shkot is connected to Russky by a thin isthmus which forms a land bridge during low tide.

The highest point in the archipelago is Russkikh Mount (291 m) on Russky Island. Three of the four inhabited islands of Primorsky Krai are in this archipelago.

Gallery

References

Archipelagoes of the Pacific Ocean
Archipelagoes of Russia
Islands of the Sea of Japan
Islands of Vladivostok
Peter the Great Gulf